Gillian Sewell (born November 1, 1972, in Belfast, Northern Ireland) is a former Irish Canadian field hockey player who earned 36 international caps for the Canada during her career.

On national level Sewell, a resident of Hamilton, Ontario, has participated in the CIAU Championships for four years and has led her team to three OWIAA Championships. She has been a CIAU and conference all star from 1991 to 1994 and 1996.

The Belfast-born Sewell claimed all-star honours in Indoor Hockey as well for both Ontario and Canada. She captained the 1993 Canadian Junior World Cup Team.

International Senior Tournaments
 1995 – Pan American Games, Mar del Plata, Argentina (3rd)
 1995 – Olympic Qualifier, Cape Town, South Africa (7th)
 1997 – World Cup Qualifier, Harare, Zimbabwe (11th)

External links
 Profile on Field Hockey Canada

1972 births
Living people
Canadian female field hockey players
Sportspeople from Hamilton, Ontario
Canadian people of Northern Ireland descent
Northern Ireland emigrants to Canada
Sportspeople from Belfast
Female field hockey players from Northern Ireland
Irish female field hockey players
British female field hockey players
Pan American Games medalists in field hockey
Pan American Games bronze medalists for Canada
Field hockey players at the 1995 Pan American Games
Medalists at the 1995 Pan American Games